Kan'u Unchō is the Japanese name of Guan Yu. This name is usually used in some Three Kingdoms–related manga and anime.

 Kanu Unchō, a female fighter in Ikki Tousen
 Kanu Unchō, a female general in Koihime Musō
 Kanu Gundam, a Gundam warrior in BB Senshi Sangokuden